Sberkassa in the Soviet Union and modern Russia is a financial institution to store the savings of the population. The term is traditionally translated as savings bank, however sberkassas in the Soviet Union were not banks in the usual sense.

A personal document for keeping track of person's savings is a kind of a bankbook  ("savings booklet", usually translated as savings book or savings-bank book). The track of deposits, withdrawals and accrued interest is written into the bankbook by a sberkassa clerk.

Imperial Russia 

Credit and savings institutions (ссудная и сохранная казна) existed in Imperial Russia since the beginning of the 19th century. The first "saving banks" (sberegatelnaya kassa) were opened in Moscow and St. Petersburg in 1842. Stolypin reform, among other things aimed at the improvement of the saving and credit systems of Russia.

Soviet Union 

In the Soviet Union the system of "State Labour Saving Offices" (государственная трудовая сберегательная касса) was instituted in 1922. The first was opened in February 1923, in Petrograd (now St. Petersburg). Eventually, Soviet sberkassas were outlets of the only Soviet bank, USSR State Bank, or Gosbank until 1988 and Sberbank (USSR Savings Bank) after the "perestroika" of the Soviet bank system. Additional functions included accepting various payments, e.g., for public utilities or fines, and depositing salaries.

Since the system of consumer credit was virtually absent in the Soviet Union, in order  to make a major purchase an ordinary Soviet citizen had to save for a long time. Therefore, like postal savings systems in other countries, the system of sberkassas was a form of government debt, a system where the Soviet state borrowed from the population.

Modern Russia 

After the dissolution of the Soviet Union the term went back to its original meaning. The functions are performed by the outlets of the Russian Federation Savings Bank. See also Construction Savings Bank ("строительная сберегательная касса", "строительно-сберегательная касса", ССК).

References

Economy of the Soviet Union
Banks of the Soviet Union
Banks of Russia